Pise may refer to:

 Rammed earth, a building technique
 Pise, Bhiwandi, a village in Maharashtra, India
 Pisa, a city in Italy 
 Charles Constantine Pise (1801–1866), a Catholic priest and writer

See also 
 Paise, previously also spelt pice, a monetary unit of South Asia